The 2017–18 Aris Thessaloniki B.C. season was the 64th appearance in the top-tier level Greek Basket League for Aris Thessaloniki. The club finished 9th in Regular season. In Greek Basketball Cup Aris Thessaloniki were eliminated by Olympiacos. The team also competed in Basketball Champions League where finished 8th in Group D of Regular season.

During the season the club changed its manager and hired Vangelis Angelou

First-team squad

Roster changes

In

Out

Competitions

Overall

Overview

Manager's Overview

Panagiotis Giannakis

Vangelis Angelou

Greek Basket League

Regular season

Standings

Results overview

Matches

Greek Cup

Quarterfinal

Semifinal

Basketball Champions League

Regular season

League table

Results overview

Matches

Players' Statistics

Total Statistics

Shooting

Last updated: 13 May 2018
Source: Sum of the Below Tables

Basket League

Shooting

Last updated: 13 May 2018
Source: ESAKE

Greek Cup

Shooting

Last updated: 5 November 2017
Source: sportsdata.gr & sportsdata.gr

Basketball Champions League

Shooting

Last updated: 7 February 2018
Source: BCL

Double-Double

References

Aris B.C. seasons